The 'Maggie' (released in the U.S.A. as High and Dry) is a 1954 British comedy film produced by Ealing Studios. Directed by Alexander Mackendrick and written by William Rose, it is a story of a clash of cultures between a hard-driving American businessman and a wily Scottish captain. Colin McArthur has made a trenchant criticism of its representation of Scotland and its relationship with American capital, and of the failure of contemporary commentators to interrogate the narrative about Scotland it constructed.

The story was inspired by Neil Munro's short stories of the Vital Spark and her captain, Para Handy.

Plot
The Maggie is a typical Clyde puffer, a small, aged cargo boat. MacTaggart, her rascal of a captain, is in dire need of £300 to renew his licence. In a shipping office in Glasgow, he overhears Mr Pusey, an Englishman complete with bowler hat and umbrella, trying to arrange for the transportation of some personal furniture for his boss, American Calvin B. Marshall. The big, reputable shipping company has nothing immediately available, so MacTaggart gets the job when Pusey mistakenly believes that he works for the company and that the more modern vessel docked next to the Maggie is MacTaggart's.

Marshall is a wealthy industrialist, a stubborn and determined self-made man. When he eventually learns the truth, he sets out in pursuit by aeroplane and hired car. Catching up with the puffer, he puts Pusey on board to ensure the cargo is transferred to another boat. But his underling is no match for the captain; he ends up in jail on a charge of poaching. Marshall realizes that he will have to handle the matter personally. After another costly chase, he boards the boat himself to spur the cargo transfer. However, the route and timing of the voyage are governed by MacTaggart, tidal variations and local community priorities.

Marshall's hostile attitude gradually softens somewhat. He is particularly touched by the loyalty of the "wee boy", Dougie, to his captain. At one point, when Marshall threatens to buy the boat from the owner, MacTaggart's sister, and sell it for scrap, Dougie drops a board on him, knocking him unconscious. His mood changes again when the wily Mactaggart moors the puffer under a wooden jetty; as the tide rises, the jetty (due for dismantling anyway) is damaged, making it impossible to transfer the furniture to the deeper draught vessel when it arrives.

At one of the unscheduled stops, the crew attend the hundredth birthday party of an islander, and Marshall chats with a nineteen-year-old girl who is pondering her future. She has two suitors, an up-and-coming, ambitious store owner and a poor fisherman. The American advises her to choose the former, but she believes she will marry the latter, explaining that he will give her his time, rather than just things. This strikes a chord with Marshall. He is having marital difficulties, and the furniture is an attempt to patch things up with his wife.

As they finally near their destination, the engine fails. Marshall manages to repair the old, poorly maintained machinery, but it is too late. The Maggie is driven by wind and tide onto some rocks. Marshall asks MacTaggart if they can save her by jettisoning the cargo. MacTaggart then apologetically informs him that he neglected to insure the furniture, but Marshall orders it thrown overboard anyway. The Maggie is saved.

At journey's end, Marshall, with some prodding by Dougie, even allows MacTaggart to keep the money he so desperately needs. In appreciation of his magnanimity, MacTaggart renames his boat the Calvin B. Marshall.

Cast
Paul Douglas as Calvin B. Marshall
Alex Mackenzie as Captain MacTaggart
Tommy Kearins as Dougie, the wee boy
James Copeland as the Mate
Abe Barker as the Engineer
Hubert Gregg as Pusey
Dorothy Alison as Miss Peters, Marshall's secretary
 Meg Buchanan as Sarah MacTaggart, the owner of the ship
Geoffrey Keen as Campbell, the owner of the large shipping company
Mark Dignam as the Laird who jails Pusey
Roddy McMillan as the Inverkerran driver

Production
The Maggie was played by two J.J. Hay boats in the film, the Boer and the Inca. Much of the film was shot on location at Islay. The film uses real place names as far as the Crinan Canal, then switches to fictional placenames once they get through it (apart from Oban, Applecross and Portree). The film's working title was "Highland Fling", during filming in the summer of 1953, but was changed to The Maggie before its release in early 1954.

Reception
According to Kinematograph Weekly the film was a "money maker" at the British box office in 1954.

Home video
Issued in the UK on VHS in 2002, a DVD followed in 2006 and was included alongside three other films in The Definitive Ealing Studios Collection: Volume Four. A digitally-restored version was issued on Blu-ray and DVD in 2015, which contains subtitles and extra features. The Maggie was released in the US on 10 March 2020 as part of an Ealing Comedy double feature entitled Whisky Galore! & The Maggie: Two Films by Alexander Mackendrick.

Further reading
 McArthur, Colin (1983), The Maggie, in Hearn, Sheila G. (ed.), Cencrastus No. 12, Spring 1983, pp. 10 –14,

References

External links

2003 interview with Tommy Kearins, who played "The Wee Boy"

1954 films
1954 comedy films
British comedy films
British black-and-white films
Ealing Studios films
Films directed by Alexander Mackendrick
Films produced by Michael Balcon
Films scored by John Addison
Films set in Glasgow
Films set in Scotland
Seafaring films
Fictional ships
1950s English-language films
1950s British films